Unió Deportiva Alcúdia is a football team based in Alcúdia in the autonomous community of Balearic Islands. Founded in 1975, it plays in the Tercera División – Group 11. Its stadium is Estadi Municipal Els Arcs with a capacity of 1,750.

Season to season

19 seasons in Tercera División

Stadium
UD Alcúdia play their home matches at Estadi Municipal Els Arcs, the municipal sports centre between Platja d'Alcúdia and Ciutat Alcúdia. It has a capacity of 5,000, with a basic cantilevered cover on one side of the pitch and a small terrace behind the goal that backs on to the sports centre.

References

External links
Futbolme team profile 
UD Alcúdia on FFIB.es 

Football clubs in the Balearic Islands
Sport in Mallorca
Association football clubs established in 1975
1975 establishments in Spain